The 2nd Rifle Division was a rifle division of the Red Army that served from the Russian Civil War to the Second World War.  Originally formed in 1919 from the 1st Ryazansk Rifle Division, the division was twice destroyed and reformed during the war.  The division contained two or three rifle regiments.

Russian Civil War 
The 2nd Rifle Division was formed in Moscow in September 1918. It fought at Ufa on the Eastern Front in April–July 1919. Then it fought against Yudenich with the 7th Army in October–December 1919. Finally it fought in the Polish Campaign on the Western Front in May–August 1920, and against Bulak-Balakhovich in October 1920.

Second World War 

During the war there were four distinct formations that bore the title of 2nd Rifle Division.

1st Formation 

Formed in 1919 in the Belorussian Military District.  On 22 June 1941 the division was part of the 1st Rifle Corps, 10th Army and took up defensive positions on the right flank of the army stationed in the Bialystok "bulge".  The division escaped from the Bialystok pocket only to be annihilated by the German army in a pocket west of Minsk in early July 1941.  The division was removed from the Soviet order of battle on 24 July 1941 and officially disbanded on 19 September 1941.
 
 13th Rifle Regiment (originally 4th Rifle Regiment)
 200th Rifle Regiment (originally 5th Rifle Regiment)
 261st Rifle Regiment (originally 6th Rifle Regiment)
 164th Light Artillery Regiment (originally 2nd Artillery Regiment)
 243rd Howitzer Regiment (possibly formed after September 1939)
 70th Antitank Battalion
 94th Antiaircraft Battalion
 320th Sapper Battalion
 91st Medical Battalion
 87th Decontamination Platoon
 84th Auto-Transport Battalion

The full honorific title of the division was the 2nd Belorussian Red Banner Rifle Division in the name of M.V. Frunze.

2nd Formation 

Formed from the 2nd Moscow Militia Division on 26 September 1941, the second formation served in the 32nd Army.  The division received new equipment to supplement the equipment issued by the Moscow Militia.  With the start of the German offensive against the Western Front at the end of September the division was forced into combat before it was fully brought up to strength.  By 10 October 1941 the division had been driven into the 19th Army's and was encircled and destroyed by the Germans in the Vyazma pocket in October 1941.  The division was destroyed by the end of October and officially removed from the order of battle on 23 November 1941.

 1282nd Rifle Regiment     from 4th Militia Regiment
 1284th Rifle Regiment     from 5th Militia Regiment
 1286th Rifle Regiment     from 6th Militia Regiment
 970th Artillery Regiment  from Artillery Regiment (no number)
 694th Separate Antitank Artillery Battalion
 469th Reconnaissance Company
 858th Separate Signals Battalion
 492nd Medical Battalion
 331st Decontamination Company
 328th Auto-Transport Company

3rd Formation 

Formed in Sevastopol fortress on 23 November 1941 from the dismounted 2nd Cavalry Division, this formation served with the Separate Coastal Army and was renamed the 109th Rifle Division on 29 January 1942.

 383rd Rifle Regiment (formed from NKVD Border Troops)(renumbered 381st Rifle Regiment 29 January 1942)
 1330th Rifle Regiment (reservists)(renumbered 456th Rifle Regiment 29 January 1942)
 Mixed Rifle Regiment (Border Troops plus dismounted cavalry)(becomes 602nd Rifle Regiment 29 January 1942)
 51st Artillery Regiment (from Corps troops)(renumbered 404th Artillery Regiment 29 January 1942)
 105th Medical Battalion (renumbered 93rd Medical Battalion 29 January 1942)

4th Formation 
Commenced forming in Arkhangelsk on 21 December 1941 possibly from the 410th Rifle Division.  By the end of March 1942 the division was "ready" for combat and transferred to the Volkhov Front.  The division took part in numerous operations, including the rescue of 2nd Shock Army (May-Jul 1942), Operation Iskra in January 1943, and the Leningrad-Novograd Strategic Offensive Operation in early 1944.  During the summer of 1944 the division took part in the operations to clear the Baltic States, ending in Estonia at the end of 1944.  During December 1944 the division was transferred to the 2nd Belorussian Front's 50th Army.  It took part in the East Prussian Strategic Offensive Operation ending the war near Königsberg as part of the 81st Rifle Corps in the 3rd Belorussian Front.  With the 81st Rifle Corps, it was withdrawn to the Kiev Military District and disbanded with the corps on 30 December 1945. 

 13th Rifle Regiment (II)
 200th Rifle Regiment (II)
 261st Rifle Regiment (II)
 164th Artillery Regiment
 70th Separate Antitank Artillery Battalion
 96th Mortar Battalion (until 29 October 1942)
 59th Reconnaissance Company
 15th Sapper Battalion
 192nd Separate Signals Battalion (formally the 773 Sep Signals Company, 43 Sep Signals Battalion)
 91st Medical Battalion
 497th Decontamination Company
 84th Auto-Transport Company

Subordination

External links and Sources
Journal of the Soviet Army

See also
 List of infantry divisions of the Soviet Union 1917–1957

References

 

002
Military units and formations established in 1919
Military units and formations disestablished in 1946
Military units and formations of the Soviet invasion of Poland

ru:2-я стрелковая дивизия (1-го формирования)